Anjali Devi (24 August 1927 – 13 January 2014) was an Indian actress, model and producer in Telugu and Tamil films. She was well known for her role as the Devi Sita in Lava Kusa as well as for the titular roles in movies like Chenchu Lakshmi, Suvarna Sundari and Anarkali.

Early life 
Anjali Devi was born in Peddapuram, East Godavari district in Andhra Pradesh, India, as Anjamma. She changed her name to Anjani Kumari when acting in dramas. Later, director C. Pullaiah changed her name to Anjali Devi.

Career

As actress 
She was a theatre artiste before venturing into movies, her debut film role was as Lohitasva in "Raja Harishchandra" in 1936. Her first film as a heroine was Kashtajeevi by L. V. Prasad in 1940, but that film was abandoned after three reels shooting. Later, C.Pullayya discovered her and gave her the opportunity to star as Mohini in Gollabhama (1947). Based on her acting ability and looks, she became a star overnight in 1947. She eventually acted in more than 350 films, majority of them in Telugu films and a few in Hindi, Tamil and Kannada films as the heroine or in character roles.

She acted in Lava Kusa, a milestone film and the first color film in the Telugu film industry in 1963. She is well known for playing Sita in Lava Kusa and her performances in films like Suvarna Sundari and Anarkali were also appreciated. Brundavanam (1992), Anna Vadina (1993) and Police Alludu (1994) were the last few films of her career. In Balaiah's Police Alludu and Anna Vadina she appeared alongside Brahmanandam. She acted in various roles, such as a damsel, an angel, a dancer, a demon, a goddess, a traditional woman and later in mother roles.

As producer 
In 1955 she produced the film Anarkali, in which she herself played the titular role, with Akkineni Nageswara Rao as Prince Salim. Then she produced V. Madhusudan Rao's Bhakta Tukaram and Chandipriya. Bollywood and Tollywood actress Jayapradha played the lead role in the latter alongside Sobhan Babu and Chiranjeevi. As a producer she has produced 27 films. An ardent devotee of Sri Sathya Sai Baba she produced and acted in Shirdi Sai Parthi Sai Divyakatha, a tele-serial on the life and avatar of Sri Sathya Sai Baba.

Personal life 
She married P. Adinarayana Rao, a music director, in 1948. They settled in Chennai. They have two sons. Together, they produced many Telugu films under the banner, Anjali Pictures. Their granddaughter, Saila Rao, is also an actress.

Death 
Devi died at the age of 86 on 13 January 2014 at Vijaya Hospital, in Chennai, due to a cardiac arrest. Her organs were donated to Ramachandra Medical College.

Awards 
 Filmfare Award for Best Actress – Telugu – Anarkali (1955)
 Filmfare Award for Best Actress – Telugu – Chenchu Lakshmi (1958)
 Filmfare Award for Best Actress – Telugu – Lava Kusa (1963)
 Honorary doctorate from Nagarjuna University, Guntur.
 Raghupathi Venkaiah Award in 1994 for her lifetime service to the Telugu film industry.
 Ramineni National Award in 2006 in the fine arts category.
 ANR National Award in 2008.
 Tamil Nadu State Film Honorary Award – Arignar Anna Award in 2000
 Padmabhushan Dr. B. Saroja Devi National Award in 2010 by Bharathiya Vidya Bhavan, Bangalore.

Filmography

Actress

Producer 
 Paradesi
 Suvarna Sundari
 Swarnamanjari
 Chandi Priya
 Sati Sakkubai
 Shirdi Sai Sathya Sai Divya Katha (television series)
   Anarkali

See also 
 Krishnaveni
 Bhanumathi
 Raghupathi Venkaiah Award
 Rashtrapati Award

References

External links 
 

1927 births
2014 deaths
Telugu film producers
Indian film actresses
Indian women film producers
Film producers from Andhra Pradesh
Recipients of the Rashtrapati Award
Actresses in Telugu cinema
Actresses in Hindi cinema
Actresses in Tamil cinema
20th-century Indian actresses
People from East Godavari district
Actresses from Andhra Pradesh
Tamil film producers
20th-century Indian businesspeople
20th-century Indian businesswomen
Businesswomen from Andhra Pradesh